John Newlove may refer to:

 John Newlove (poet) (1938–2003), Canadian poet 
 John Newlove (rugby league) (born 1944), English rugby league footballer